Laura Jones may refer to:
Laura Jones (gymnast) (born 1992), British gymnast
Laura Jones (journalist) (born 1975), British television journalist
Laura Jones (screenwriter) (born 1951), Australian screenwriter
Laura Jones (soccer) (born 1969), American soccer player
Laura Anne Jones (born 1979), former member of the National Assembly for Wales
Laura Jones (economist), Canadian economist and policy analyst
Laura Jones (politician), American politician, member of the New Hampshire House of Representatives
Laura Jones (born 1960), American singer, better known by her stage name Laura Love